Quantum chromodynamics binding energy (QCD binding energy), gluon binding energy or chromodynamic binding energy is the energy binding quarks together into hadrons. It is the energy of the field of the strong force, which is mediated by gluons. Motion-energy and interaction-energy contribute most of the hadron's mass.

Source of mass
Most of the mass of hadrons is actually QCD binding energy, through mass–energy equivalence. This phenomenon is related to chiral symmetry breaking. In the case of nucleons – protons and neutrons – QCD binding energy forms about 99% of the nucleon's mass. That is if assuming that the kinetic energy of the hadron's constituents, moving at near the speed of light, which contributes greatly to the hadron mass, is part of QCD binding energy. Considering that nearly all of the atom's mass is concentrated in the nucleons, this means that about 99% of the mass of everyday matter (baryonic matter) is, in fact, chromodynamic binding energy.

Gluon energy
While gluons are massless, they still possess energy – chromodynamic binding energy. In this way, they are similar to photons, which are also massless particles carrying energy – photon energy. The amount of energy per single gluon, or "gluon energy", cannot be calculated. Unlike photon energy, which is quantifiable, described by the Planck–Einstein relation and depends on a single variable (the photon's frequency), no formula exists for the quantity of energy carried by each gluon. While the effects of a single photon can be observed, single gluons have not been observed outside of a hadron. Due to the mathematical complexity of quantum chromodynamics and the somewhat chaotic structure of hadrons, which are composed of gluons, valence quarks, sea quarks and other virtual particles, it is not even measurable how many gluons exist at a given moment inside a hadron. Additionally, not all of the QCD binding energy is gluon energy, but rather, some of it comes from the kinetic energy of the hadron's constituents. Therefore, only the total QCD binding energy per hadron can be stated. However, in the future, studies into quark–gluon plasma might be able to overcome this.

See also
Gluon
Quark
Current quark and constituent quark
Hadron
Strong force
Quantum chromodynamics
Chiral symmetry breaking
Photon energy
Invariant mass and relativistic mass
Binding energy

References

   Decomposition of the proton mass (Lattice QCD): https://physics.aps.org/articles/v11/118

Physical quantities
Hadrons
Binding Energy
Binding energy